25TFM-NBOMe (also known as NBOMe-2C-TFM, 2C-TFM-NBOMe, and Cimbi-138) is a derivative of the phenethylamine hallucinogen 2C-TFM, discovered in 2004 by Ralf Heim at the Free University of Berlin. It acts as a potent partial agonist for the 5HT2A receptor, though its relative potency is disputed, with some studies finding it to be of lower potency than 25I-NBOMe,  while others show it to be of similar or higher potency, possibly because of differences in the assay used. 2C-TFM-NB2OMe can be taken to produce psychedelic effects similar to 2C-I-NB2OMe and 2C-D-NB2OMe.

Legality

United Kingdom

See also
 DOTFM
 TFMFly
 2CBCB-NBOMe (NBOMe-TCB-2)
 2CBFly-NBOMe (NBOMe-2CB-Fly)
 25C-NBOMe (NBOMe-2CC)
 25B-NBOMe (NBOMe-2CB)
 25D-NBOMe (NBOMe-2CD)
 25I-NBOMe (NBOMe-2CI)
 25I-NBMD (NBMD-2CI)
 25B-NBOH
 25I-NBOH (NBOH-2CI)
 25I-NBF (NBF-2CI)

References

25-NB (psychedelics)
Trifluoromethyl compounds